In mathematics, a sequence of nested intervals can be intuitively understood as an ordered collection of intervals  on the real number line with natural numbers  as an index. In order for a sequence of intervals to be considered nested intervals, two conditions have to be met:

 Every interval in the sequence is contained in the previous one ( is always a subset of ).
 The length of the intervals get arbitrarily small (meaning the length falls below every possible threshold  after a certain index ).

In other words, the left bound of the interval  can only increase, and the right bound can only decrease.

Historically - long before anyone defined nested intervals in a textbook - people implicitly constructed such nestings for concrete calculation purposes. For example, the ancient Babylonians discovered a method for computing square roots of numbers. In contrast, the famed Archimedes constructed sequences of polygons, that inscribed and surcumscribed a unit circle, in order to get a lower and upper bound for the circles circumference - which is the circle number Pi.

The central question to be posed is the nature of the intersection over all the natural numbers, or, put differently, the set of numbers, that are found in every Interval  (thus, for all ). In modern mathematics, nested intervals are used as a construction method for the real numbers (in order to complete the field of rational numbers).

Historic motivation
As stated in the introduction, historic users of mathematics discovered the nesting of intervals and closely related algorithms as methods for specific calculations. Some variations and modern interpretations of these ancient techniques will be introduced here:

Computation of square roots
One intuitive algorithm is so easy to understand, that it could well be found by engaged high school students. When trying to find the square root of a number , one can be certain that , which gives the first interval , in which  has to be found. If one knows the next higher perfect square , one can get an even better candidate for the first interval: .

The other intervals  can now be defined recursively by looking at the sequence of midpoints . Given the interval  is already known (starting at ), one can define

 

If the midpoint is smaller, one can set it as the lower bound of the next interval , and if the midpoint is larger, one can set it as the upper bound of the next interval. This guarantees that . With this construction the intervals are nested and their length  get halved in every step of the recursion.

One can also compute , when . In this case , and the algorithm can be used by setting  and calculating the reciprocal after the desired level of precision has been acquired.

Example
Note that since, the first interval for the algorithm can be defined as, since  must certainly found within this interval. Thus, using this interval, one can continue to the next step of the algorithm by calculating the midpoint of the interval, determining whether the square of the midpoint is greater than or less than 19, and setting the boundaries of the next interval accordingly before repeating the process:

 

 This procedure can be repeated as many times as needed to attain the desired level of precision. Theoretically, by repeating the steps indefinitely, one can arrive at the true value of this square root.

Herons method
The modern description using nested intervals is similar to the algorithm above, but instead of using a sequence of midpoints, one uses a sequence  given by

 .

This algorithm is a special case of Newton's method.

Archimedes' circle measurement

As shown in the image, lower and upper bounds for the circumference of a circle can be obtained with inscribed and circumscribed regular polygons. When examining a circle with diameter , the circumference is (by definition of Pi) the circle number . 

Around 250 BCE Archimedes of Syracuse started with regular hexagons, whose side lengths (and therefore circumference) can be directly calculated from the circle diameter. Furthermore, a way to compute the side length of a regular -gon from the previous -gon can be found, starting at the regular hexagon (-gon).

Soon after, more powerful methods for the computation were found.

Other implementations
Early uses of sequences of nested intervals (or can be described as such with modern mathematics), can be found in the predecessors of calculus (differentiation and integration). In computer science, sequences of nested intervals is used in algorithms for numerical computation. I.e. the Bisection method can be used for calculating the roots of continuous functions. In contrast to mathematically infinite sequences, an applied computational algorithm terminates at some point, when the desired zero has been found or sufficiently well approximated.

The construction of the real numbers
In mathematical analysis, nested intervals provide one method of axiomatically introducing the real numbers as the completion of the rational numbers, being a necessity for discussing the concepts of continuity and differentiability. Historically, Isaac Newton's and Gottfried Wilhelm Leibniz's discovery of differential and integral calculus from the late 1600s has posed a huge challenge for mathematicians trying to prove their methods rigorously; despite their success in physics, engineering and other sciences. The axiomatic description of nested intervals (or an equivalent axiom) has become an important foundation for the modern understanding of calculus.

Definition
Let  be a sequence of closed intervals of the type  , where  denotes the length of such an interval. One can call  a sequence of nested intervals, if
 
 .

Put into words, property 1 means, that the intervals are nested according to their index. The second property formalizes the notion, that interval sizes get arbitrarily small; meaning, that for an arbitrary constant  one can always find an interval (with index ) with a length strictly smaller than that number . It is also worth noting that property 1 immediately implies that every interval with an index   must also have a length .

Remark
Note that some authors refer to such interval-sequences, satisfying both properties above, as shrinking nested intervals. In this case a sequence of nested intervals refers to a sequence that only satisfies property 1.

Axiom of completeness
If  is a sequence of nested intervals, there always exists a real number, that is contained in every interval . In formal notation this axiom guarantees, that

.

Theorem
The intersection of each sequence   of nested intervals contains exactly one real number .

Proof: This statement can easily be verified by contradiction. Assume that there exist two different numbers . From  it follows, that they differ by  Since both numbers have to be contained in every interval, it follows that  for all . This contradicts property 2 from the definition of nested intervals; therefore, the intersection can contain at most one number . The completeness axiom guarantees, that such a real number  exists.

Notes
 This axiom is fundamental in the sense that a sequence of nested intervals does not necessarily contain a rational number - meaning that  could yield , if only considering the rationals.
 The axiom is equivalent to the existence of the infimum and supremum (proof below), the convergence of Cauchy sequences and the Bolzano–Weierstrass theorem. This means that one of the four has to be introduced axiomatically, while the other three can be successively proven.

Direct consequences of the axiom

Existence of roots
This means there exists a unique real number , such that .

Existence of infimum and supremum in bounded Sets

Definition

Only one such number  can exist. Analogously one can define the infimum of a set , that is bounded from below, as the greatest lower bound of that set.

Theorem
Each set  has a supremum (infimum), if it is bounded from above (below).

Proof: Without loss of generality one can look at a set  that has an upper bound. One can now construct a sequence  of nested intervals , that has the following two properties:

The construction follows a recursion by starting with any number , that is not an upper bound (e.g. , where
 and an arbitrary upper bound  of ). Given  for some  one can compute the midpoint  and define

Note that this interval sequence is well defined and obviously a sequence of nested intervals by construction.

But this is a contradiction to property 1 of the supremum (meaning  for all ).

But from  one gets  and therefore .

Remark
In effect the two are actually equivalent, meaning that either of the two can be introduced axiomatically.

Proof: Let  with  be a sequence of nested intervals. Then the set  is bounded from above, where every  is an upper bound. This implies, that the least upper bound  fulfills  for all . Therefore  for all , respectively .

Further consequences
After formally defining the convergence of sequences and accumulation points of sequences, one can also prove the Bolzano–Weierstrass theorem using nested intervals. In a follow-up, the fact, that Cauchy sequences are convergent (and that all convergent sequences are Cauchy sequences) can be proven. This in turn allows for a proof of the completeness property above, showing their equivalence.

Further discussion of related aspects

Without any specifying what is meant by interval, all that can be said about the intersection  over all the naturals (i.e. the set of all points common to each interval) is that it is either the empty set , a point on the number line (called a singleton ), or some interval.

The possibility of an empty intersection can be illustrated by looking at a sequence of open intervals .

In this case, the empty set  results from the intersection . This is given by the Archimedean property of the real numbers. Therefore, no matter how small , one can always find intervals  in the sequence, such that  implying that the intersection has to be empty.

The situation is different for closed intervals. If one changes the situation above by looking at closed intervals of the type , one can see this very clearly. One can conclude that, in this case, .

By De Morgan's laws, the complement of the intersection is a union of two disjoint open sets. By the connectedness of the real line there must be something between them. This shows that the intersection of (even an uncountable number of) nested, closed, and bounded intervals is nonempty.

Higher dimensions
In two dimensions there is a similar result: nested closed disks in the plane must have a common intersection. This result was shown by Hermann Weyl to classify the singular behaviour of certain differential equations.

See also
Bisection
Cantor's intersection theorem

References

.
.
.

Sets of real numbers
Theorems in real analysis